State Highway 38 is a state highway in the Indian state of Andhra Pradesh.

Route 

It starts at Bheemunipatnam (Vemulavalasa Junction) and passes through Pendurthi (Visakhapatnam), Sabbavaram, Chodavaram,  Narsipatnam, Koyyuru, Rajavommangi, Addateegala, Rampachodavaram and ends at Devipatnam.

See also 
 List of State Highways in Andhra Pradesh

References 

State Highways in Andhra Pradesh
Roads in East Godavari district
Roads in Visakhapatnam district